Louis Cody Sossamon (June 2, 1921 – February 11, 2019) was an American football center and linebacker who played three seasons with the New York Yankees professional football team. He played college football at the University of South Carolina, having previously attended high school in his hometown of Gaffney, South Carolina. He was a member of the University of South Carolina and South Carolina State Athletic Halls of Fame.

References

1921 births
2019 deaths
American football centers
American football linebackers
Bainbridge Commodores football players
New York Yankees (AAFC) players
South Carolina Gamecocks football players
People from Gaffney, South Carolina
Players of American football from South Carolina